{{DISPLAYTITLE:C9H8N2O2}}
The molecular formula C9H8N2O2 (molar mass: 176.17 g/mol, exact mass: 176.0586 u) may refer to:

 Methyl phenyldiazoacetate
 Pemoline

Molecular formulas